Betânia (Bethany) is a city  in the state of Pernambuco, Brazil. The population in 2020, according to IBGE was 12,765 and the area is 1244.07 km².

The municipality contains the  Maurício Dantas Private Natural Heritage Ecological Reserve, created in 1997.
The municipality was designated a priority area for conservation and sustainable use when the Caatinga Ecological Corridor was created in 2006.

Geography

 State - Pernambuco
 Region - Sertão Pernambucano
 Boundaries - Flores and Calumbi   (N);  Floresta  (S);  Custódia  (E);  Serra Talhada and Floresta   (W)
 Area - 1244.07 km²
 Elevation - 441 m
 Hydrography - Pajeú River
 Vegetation - Caatinga hiperxerófila
 Climate - semi arid - hot and dry
 Annual average temperature - 28.0 c
 Distance to Recife - 391 km

Economy

The main economic activities in Betânia are based in agribusiness, especially creation of goats, cattle, sheep;  and plantations of corn, tomatoes and beans.

Economic Indicators

Economy by Sector
2006

Health Indicators

References

Municipalities in Pernambuco